A peal is a bell-ringing performance consisting of 5000 or more changes.

Peal or Peals may also refer to:

Places
Peal de Becerro, city located in the province of Jaén, Spain
Mount Peal, in the Beartooth Mountains in the U.S. state of Montana

People
Alexander Louis Peal, Liberian forester and conservationist
Samuel Peal (born 1754), British manufacturer who developed a method of waterproofing cloth
Samuel Edward Peal (1923–1991), Liberian diplomat and politician

Other
N.Peal, British luxury cashmere knitwear and accessories specialist
Peals (band), American band

Acronyms
PEALS, Policy, Ethics and Life Sciences Research Centre

See also
Peal board, recording a peal rung on church bells